Yakumo may refer to:

 Yakumo, Hokkaidō, a town in Hokkaidō Prefecture, Japan
 Yakumo, Shimane, a village in Shimane Prefecture, Japan
 Yakumo (train), a train service in Japan
 Japanese cruiser Yakumo, a cruiser of the Imperial Japanese Navy
 Yakumo Fujii, the main character in 3×3 Eyes media
 Yakumo, a main character in the anime Shinzo
 Yakumo Tsukamoto, a character in School Rumble media
 Yakumo, a character in Yu Yu Hakusho The Movie: Poltergeist Report
 Ran Yakumo and Yukari Yakumo, characters in Touhou Project media
 Psychic Detective Yakumo
 Lafcadio Hearn or Koizumi Yakumo (小泉 八雲?) (1850–1904), international writer known for his collections of Japanese legends and ghost stories

Japanese unisex given names
Japanese-language surnames